Imam Hassan District is in Deylam County, Bushehr province, Iran. At the 2006 census, its population was 4,383 in 959 households. The following census in 2011 counted 4,615 people in 1,147 households. At the latest census in 2016, the district had 4,866 inhabitants living in 1,319 households.

References 

Districts of Bushehr Province
Populated places in Deylam County